Eutaw is a city in and the county seat of Greene County, Alabama, United States. At the 2020 census, the population was 2,937. The city was named in honor of the Battle of Eutaw Springs, the last engagement of the American Revolutionary War in the Carolinas.

History 

Eutaw was laid out in December 1838 at the time that Greene County voters chose to relocate the county seat from Erie, which was located on the Black Warrior River. It was incorporated by an act of the state legislature on January 2, 1841.

As the county seat, Eutaw also developed as the trading center for the county, which developed an economy based on cultivation and processing of cotton, the chief commodity crop in the antebellum years. The crop was lucrative for major planters, who depended on the labor of enslaved African Americans and built fine homes in the city. Many have been preserved. Eutaw has twenty-seven antebellum structures on the National Register of Historic Places. Twenty-three of these are included in the Antebellum Homes in Eutaw multiple property submission. The Coleman-Banks House, Old Greene County Courthouse, First Presbyterian Church, and Kirkwood are listed individually. Additionally, the Greene County Courthouse Square District is a listed historic district in the heart of downtown. A nearby property, Everhope Plantation, is also listed in the register.

During the Reconstruction Era, Eutaw was the site of a number of Klan murders and acts by insurgents. The county courthouse was burned in 1868; the prevailing theory for the burning of the courthouse is that it was intended to destroy the records of some 1,800 suits by freedmen against planters, which were about to be prosecuted. On March 31, 1870, the Republican county solicitor, Alexander Boyd, was shot and killed at his hotel when resisting being taken by a masked group of armed Klan members. (An early-20th century historian of the Klan claimed the group was from Mississippi.) That same night, James Martin, a black Republican leader, was killed near his home in Union, Alabama, also in Greene County.

In the fall of 1870, in the run-up to the gubernatorial election, two more black Republican politicians were killed in Greene County. On October 25, 1870, whites attacked a Republican rally in the courthouse square that had attracted 2,000 black Republicans. The Eutaw massacre resulted in four black deaths and some 54 wounded outside the county courthouse. Most blacks did not vote in the fall's election, which helped the Democratic candidate for governor.

The use of violence and intimidation of blacks continued across Alabama in the Post-Reconstruction era. Lynchings took place in the state, but none were documented in Greene County during this period, according to a 2015 report by the Equal Justice Initiative. This may be attributable to local officials enforcing the rule of law. On May 16, 1892, Sheriff Cullen and Deputy Sheriff E. C. Meredith of Greene County, with aid of a posse, distinguished themselves by going into Pickens County after a lynch mob of about 50 men. The mob had taken African-American suspect Jim Jones from the Greene County jail, saying they were going to hang him in Carrollton for an alleged crime there. Cullen and his posse confronted the mob at gunpoint, and took Jones back to Greene County.

20th century to present
Agriculture continues to dominate the county's economy. Now conducted on an industrial scale, it has reduced the need for farm workers. Unemployment is high in the rural county.

James Bevel, the main strategist and architect of the Civil Rights Movement, was buried in Ancestors Village Cemetery in Eutaw on December 29, 2008. In addition to his early work in the Nashville Student Movement and Mississippi movement, Bevel initiated, planned, and directed the strategies for the 1963 Birmingham Children's Crusade, the 1965 Selma to Montgomery march, and the 1966 Chicago Open Housing Movement.

Eutaw is home to the Roman Catholic Convent of Our Lady of Consolata, the Consolata Sisters, a small monastery for nuns in West Alabama. They are known throughout Greene County for their humanitarian efforts.

Geography
Eutaw is located east of the center of Greene County. U.S. Routes 11 and 43 pass through the center of town. The highways enter together from the northeast as Tuscaloosa Street; US 11 exits the city to the west as Boligee Street, while US 43 leaves to the south as Demopolis Highway. Alabama State Route 14 passes through the city as Greensboro Street to the southeast and Mesopotamia Street to the northwest.

Climate
The climate in this area is characterized by hot, humid summers and generally mild to cool winters.  According to the Köppen Climate Classification system, Eutaw has a humid subtropical climate, abbreviated "Cfa" on climate maps.

Demographics

2020 census

As of the 2020 United States census, there were 2,937 people, 1,041 households, and 551 families residing in the town.

2010 census
At the 2010 census there were 2,934 people in 1,203 households, including 760 families, in the city. The racial makeup of the city was 80.2% Black or African American, 18.1% White, 0.1% Native American, 0.4% Asian, and 0.6% from two or more races. 1.3% of the population were Hispanic or Latino of any race.
Of the 1,203 households 25.6% had children under the age of 18 living with them, 30.8% were married couples living together, 28.4% had a female householder with no husband present, and 36.8% were non-families. 34.2% of households were one person and 15.5% were one person aged 65 or older. The average household size was 2.40 and the average family size was 3.10.

The age distribution was 25.8% under the age of 18, 9.2% from 18 to 24, 19.8% from 25 to 44, 28.4% from 45 to 64, and 16.8% 65 or older. The median age was 39 years. For every 100 females, there were 82.7 males. For every 100 females age 18 and over, there were 77.5 males.

The median household income was $29,196 and the median family income  was $39,722. Males had a median income of $43,125 versus $28,077 for females. The per capita income for the city was $14,126. About 27.4% of families and 28.7% of the population were below the poverty line, including 38.7% of those under age 18 and 17.0% of those age 65 or over.

2000 census
At the 2000 census there were 1,878 people in 778 households, including 504 families, in the city. The racial makeup of the city was 33.01% White, 66.03% Black or African American, 0.27% Native American, 0.21% Asian, and 0.48% from two or more races. 0.37% of the population were Hispanic or Latino of any race.
Of the 778 households 24.7% had children under the age of 18 living with them, 39.5% were married couples living together, 21.5% had a female householder with no husband present, and 35.1% were non-families. 33.5% of households were one person and 15.4% were one person aged 65 or older. The average household size was 2.31 and the average family size was 2.95.

The age distribution was 22.4% under the age of 18, 8.0% from 18 to 24, 22.6% from 25 to 44, 24.4% from 45 to 64, and 22.5% 65 or older. The median age was 43 years. For every 100 females, there were 84.8 males. For every 100 females age 18 and over, there were 75.9 males.

The median household income was $23,056 and the median family income  was $32,946. Males had a median income of $30,284 versus $18,869 for females. The per capita income for the city was $14,573. About 24.7% of families and 28.9% of the population were below the poverty line, including 39.4% of those under age 18 and 22.5% of those age 65 or over.

Notable people
Benjamin F. Alexander, state representative during the Reconstruction era
 Oliver H. Cross, U.S. Representative from Texas
 Edward deGraffenried, U.S. Representative from Alabama's 6th congressional district
 Cob Jarvis, basketball player and head basketball coach for the University of Mississippi
 Bill Lee, professional football player
 Matthew Leonard, Sergeant First Class who posthumously received the Medal of Honor and Purple Heart for his actions in the Vietnam War
 James McQueen, president of Sloss-Sheffield Steel & Iron Company
 Willie Powell, baseball pitcher in the Negro leagues
 Bo Scarbrough, professional football player

In popular culture
Eutaw is the home town of the protagonist in the 2004 Old Crow Medicine Show song "Big Time in the Jungle" . The band also released a 2001 album entitled Eutaw. In addition, the town's name is referenced in the song "Don't Ride That Horse," among the other cities of Winnipeg, Joliet, Saskatoon, and Wawa.

The 1981 horror film Jaws of Satan takes place in Eutaw.

See also
National Register of Historic Places listings in Greene County, Alabama

References

External links
Davis, Stephen Duane II, and Alfred L. Brophy, "The Most Esteemed Act of My Life: Family, Property, Will, and Trust in the Antebellum South", an empirical study of probate in Greene County, Alabama

Cities in Alabama
Cities in Greene County, Alabama
County seats in Alabama
Tuscaloosa, Alabama metropolitan area